Wyoming's 1st State Senate district is one of 30 districts in the Wyoming Senate. It has been represented by Republican Senator Ogden Driskill, Driskill has been the Majority Leader since 2021.

List of members representing the district

Recent election results

Federal and statewide results

2006

2010

2014

2018
Republican Incumbent Ogden Driskill was re-elected with no challenger.

References

Wyoming Senate districts